Reddell is a census-designated place and unincorporated community in Evangeline Parish, Louisiana, United States. As of the 2010 census it had a population of 733.

Reddell has a post office (ZIP code 70580), grocery store, and one of the largest rice drier elevators in the state.

Demographics

References

External links

Census-designated places in Evangeline Parish, Louisiana
Unincorporated communities in Louisiana
Census-designated places in Louisiana
Unincorporated communities in Evangeline Parish, Louisiana